is a former Japanese football player. She played for Japan national team.

Club career
Hara was born in Ome on March 1, 1989. She was promoted to Nippon TV Beleza from youth team in 2006. Especially since 2009, she played in many games as a successor of Japan national team player Homare Sawa moved to United States. She played until 2015. In 10 seasons, she played 149 matches in L.League and she was selected Best Eleven in 2015.

National team career
In April 2005, when Hara was 16 years old, she was selected Japan U-17 national team for 2005 AFC U-17 Championship. At the tournament, she played as captain and she became top scorer with 12 goals. She
was named Asian Footballer of the Year. In November 2008, Natsuko Hara was selected for the Japan U-20 national team for the 2008 U-20 World Cup. On January 13, 2010, she played for the Japan national team for the first time against Denmark. She played two games for Japan in 2010.

National team statistics

References

External links

1989 births
Living people
Association football people from Tokyo
Japanese women's footballers
Japan women's international footballers
Nadeshiko League players
Nippon TV Tokyo Verdy Beleza players
Women's association football midfielders
People from Ōme, Tokyo